Chen Lin may refer to:

Chen Lin (Han dynasty) (died 217), Han dynasty minister, author and poet
Chen Lin (painter) (c. 1260–c. 1320), Yuan dynasty painter
Chen Lin (Ming dynasty) (1543–1607), Ming dynasty naval general
Chen Lin (singer) (1970–2009), Chinese pop singer
Chen Lin (badminton) (born 1977), Chinese badminton player
Chen Lin (diver), Chinese diver
Lin Chen (playwright) (1919–2004)
Lin Chen (economist), 20th- and 21st-century economist; see Chen model